The 1991 NFL draft was the procedure by which National Football League teams selected amateur college football players. It is officially known as the NFL Annual Player Selection Meeting. The draft was held April 21–22, 1991, at the Marriott Marquis in New York City, New York. No teams elected to claim any players in the supplemental draft that year.

The first six selections of the draft were defensive players, the most in draft history. It began with the Dallas Cowboys using the first overall pick to select Russell Maryland. No previous draft had begun with more than three consecutive defensive picks.

The day of the draft, wide receiver and projected number one pick Raghib Ismail signed with the Toronto Argonauts of the Canadian Football League (CFL). He was nevertheless selected by the Los Angeles Raiders in the fourth round (100th overall), and began playing with the Raiders in 1993 after two CFL seasons.

Player selections

Hall of Famers
 Aeneas Williams, cornerback from Southern, taken 3rd round 59th overall by Phoenix Cardinals. 
Inducted: Professional Football Hall of Fame class of 2014.
 Brett Favre, quarterback from Southern Mississippi, taken in the 2nd round 33rd overall by Atlanta Falcons.
Inducted: Professional Football Hall of Fame class of 2016.

Notable undrafted players

References

External links
 NFL.com – 1991 Draft
 databaseFootball.com – 1991 Draft
 Pro Football Hall of Fame

National Football League Draft
NFL Draft
Draft
NFL Draft
NFL Draft
American football in New York City
1990s in Manhattan
Sporting events in New York City
Sports in Manhattan